Donald Thomas Gordon (born October 10, 1959) is a former Major League Baseball pitcher who played for three seasons. He pitched for the Toronto Blue Jays from 1986 to 1987 and the Cleveland Indians from 1987 to 1988. He has the distinction of being traded for a hall of famer, Phil Niekro, on 8/10/97. Neither player would appear in the majors after the following season.

Gordon attended The Citadel and the University of South Carolina. In 1981, he played collegiate summer baseball with the Hyannis Mets of the Cape Cod Baseball League. He was selected by the Detroit Tigers in the 31st round of the 1982 MLB Draft.

References

External links
, or Pelota Binaria (Venezuelan Winter League)

1959 births
Living people
American expatriate baseball players in Canada
Birmingham Barons players
Bristol Tigers players
Cardenales de Lara players
American expatriate baseball players in Venezuela
Cleveland Indians players
Colorado Springs Sky Sox players
Denver Zephyrs players
El Paso Diablos players
Hyannis Harbor Hawks players
Knoxville Blue Jays players
Major League Baseball pitchers
Baseball players from New York City
South Carolina Gamecocks baseball players
Syracuse Chiefs players
The Citadel Bulldogs baseball players
Toronto Blue Jays players